The 1992 Ms. Olympia contest was an IFBB professional bodybuilding competition was held on October 17, 1992, at the Arie Crown Theater in Chicago, Illinois. It was the 13th Ms. Olympia competition held. Many competitors competed but ultimately Lee Haney took the trophy with an amazing physique.

Results

See also
 1992 Mr. Olympia

References

 Women of Steel: Female Bodybuilders and the Struggle for Self-Definition
 1992 Ms. Olympia held in Chicago on October 17th 
 1992 Ms. Olympia results

External links
 Competitor History of the Ms. Olympia

Ms Olympia, 1992
1992 in bodybuilding
Ms. Olympia
Ms. Olympia
History of female bodybuilding